Akram Ahmed was a veteran of the Bangladesh Liberation War as a pilot as part of Operation Kilo Flight, the beginning of Bangladesh Air Force. For his bravery in the war, the government of Bangladesh awarded him the title of Bir Uttom, one of a few civilians to have received the award.

Early life

Career 
In 1971, Akram Ahmed worked in the East Pakistan Plant Protection Directorate. At that time, the Plant Protection Directorate had its own crop duster to control insects. When the Bangladesh Liberation War started, he fled from Dhaka to India in May. There he met Khaled Musharraf and expressed interest in taking part in the ground war. Khaled Musharraf told him to stay in Agartala for some time. A few months later the air wing of Mukti Bahini was formed. Ahmed took part in about 12 took part in the attack.

After midnight on 2 December 1971 Ahmed flew a small plane from an Indian airport for Bangladesh. He was accompanied by Shamsul Alam. Their target was the oil depot in Chittagong Port. They arrived at their target after flying for about three hours. They successfully bombed the airport with no navigation equipment except a compass.

After the Bangladesh Liberation War ended Ahmed joined Bangladesh Biman, the national airlines of Bangladesh. He was active in the Nirmul Committee.

Ahmed worked as a senior consultant of Civil Aviation Authority of Bangladesh.

Death 
Ahmed died on 7 December 2020, at the Combined Military Hospital in Dhaka. He was hospitalized with pneumonia after catching COVID-19 during the COVID-19 pandemic in Bangladesh. He was buried in Banani graveyard with a guard of honor provided by Bangladesh Air Force.

References 

20th-century births
2020 deaths
People from Jessore District
Recipients of the Bir Uttom
Burials at Banani Graveyard
Deaths from the COVID-19 pandemic in Bangladesh